Novotroitsk is a rural locality (a selo) and the administrative center of Novotroitsky Selsoviet, Talmensky District, Altai Krai, Russia. The population was 571 as of 2013. There are 12 streets.

Geography 
Novotroitsk is located 18 km northeast of Talmenka (the district's administrative centre) by road. Taskayevo is the nearest rural locality.

References 

Rural localities in Talmensky District